Miguel Angel Aguilar Obando  (born 21 January 1953 in Usulután), sometimes known as "La Peluda" , is a Salvadoran football coach.

References

1953 births
Living people
People from Usulután Department
Salvadoran football managers
El Salvador national football team managers
C.D. Luis Ángel Firpo managers
Salvadoran footballers
Association footballers not categorized by position
Municipal Limeño managers